Roman Nádvorník (born 21 March 1973) is a Czech football manager and former player. He managed 1. FK Příbram and FK Viktoria Žižkov in the Czech First League.

Nádvorník joined Vlašim as manager on 1 January 2009, taking over from Zdeněk Hašek. Nádvorník guided the team to the Bohemian Football League title in June 2009, with a thirteen-point lead at the end of the season.

Following a strong start to the 2010–11 Czech 2. Liga, with Vlašim leading the division on 4 October 2010, he moved to Czech First League side Příbram as a replacement for Martin Hřídel. His tenure only lasted six months however, as he was sacked in April 2011 following a sequence of five consecutive defeats. In June 2011, he returned to Vlašim as manager. After the autumn part of the 2011–12 Czech 2. Liga, Nádvorník moved to Czech First League liga side Viktoria Žižkov, replacing Martin Pulpit, with the club having taken just seven points from the opening 14 matches. Žižkov went on to be relegated with Nádvorník staying on as the club adjusted to life in the Czech 2. Liga, but with the club four points away from the promotion places after three games of the spring part of the 2012–13 season and not having scored in 291 minutes, he was replaced by Italian manager Giancarlo Favarin. Nádvorník joined Czech 2. Liga side FC MAS Táborsko in April 2013 with the objective of saving the club's status in the division. He was replaced as manager at Táborsko in the spring of 2014 due to personal issues. On 13 September 2022, Nádvorník was named as new head coach of Silon Táborsko.

Honours

Managerial
 Vlašim
 Bohemian Football League (1): 2008–09

References

External links
 Manager profile at idnes.cz 

1973 births
Living people
Czech footballers
Czechoslovak footballers
Czech football managers
Czech First League managers
FC Sellier & Bellot Vlašim managers
1. FK Příbram managers
FK Viktoria Žižkov managers
MFK Karviná managers
Association footballers not categorized by position
FC Silon Táborsko managers
Czech National Football League managers
Bohemian Football League managers
FC Slavoj Vyšehrad managers
AEP Kozani F.C. managers
Al Dhaid SC managers
Expatriate football managers in Greece
Expatriate football managers in the United Arab Emirates
Czech expatriate sportspeople in Greece
Czech expatriate sportspeople in the United Arab Emirates